Morituri (also known as The Saboteur: Code Name Morituri) is a 1965 war film about the Allied sabotage during World War II of a German merchant ship carrying rubber, a critical product during the war. The film stars Marlon Brando, Yul Brynner, Martin Benrath, Janet Margolin, Trevor Howard and Wally Cox. It was directed by Bernhard Wicki. The filming occurred almost exclusively on an old German freighter.

Plot
Robert Crain (Marlon Brando) is a wealthy German engineer and pacifist who fled to India under a fabricated Swiss identity after being conscripted into the Wehrmacht at the start of World War II. He is blackmailed by English Colonel Statter (Trevor Howard) and the Allies into participating in a plan to seize a shipment of rubber, which is in short supply and essential for both sides' war efforts, that will soon be carried by the German merchant ship Ingo from Japan to Nazi-occupied Bordeaux. As all German merchant ships are under orders to scuttle themselves to prevent the capture of their cargoes by Allied forces, Crain's task is to use his engineering knowledge to disable the scuttling charges on the Ingo before the Allies move to take the ship. Crain is provided with fake documentation and a cover story: he is Standartenführer Hans Keil, a high-ranking SS officer needing to return to Germany.

Aboard the Ingo, Crain finds the captain, Mueller (Yul Brynner), to be a patriotic German whose humanistic inclinations are at odds with Nazi principles. The first officer, Kruse (Martin Benrath), is a fanatical Party member who keeps a close eye on the captain, and the crew is a mix of Nazi loyalists and political prisoners who were pressed into service due to labor shortages. Crain begins covertly locating and disarming the scuttling charges. To deflect suspicion about his movements, he uses the charges to convince Kruse, who is unaware of the scuttling protocol, that he is secretly tasked with protecting the ship from a saboteur, and stokes Kruse's doubts about the captain's loyalties. Later, after one of the prisoners tries to kill Crain, he enlists them in a plan to have the Allies take the ship, while also winning Mueller's grudging trust by persuading him not to fire the scuttling charges when the ship is almost torpedoed by a Japanese submarine due to its disguise as a British merchantman.

That submarine has two German Naval officers aboard, along with a number of American prisoners and Esther (Janet Margolin), a young German-Jewish woman who has been raped and tortured by her Nazi captors. Complications arise when the submarine meets with the ship to transfer Esther and the prisoners. Despite the horrors Esther was subjected to, she is still openly defiant of every German she encounters on board the ship, including Mueller and Crain. When Mueller is alone with her, he is able to overcome her expectation that he too is a brutalizer, adding that he will assist her to escape once the ship gets to Europe, a hope that is soon dashed when Kruse also learns that she is Jewish. Later Crain persuades her to join in his plot, but she is disgusted by his lack of commitment to the anti-Nazi cause.

The two German Naval officers, who are familiar with military personnel and operations in the Far East, become suspicious of Crain's SS identity and return to the submarine to check on his credentials by radioing to Berlin, giving Crain less than 24 hours to complete his mission. While awaiting the Naval officers' report  Captain Mueller hears that his son, a German Navy officer, has been decorated for sinking an Allied hospital ship. Disgusted by this, Mueller becomes drunk and reveals in a rage the full extent of his anti-Nazi beliefs, which gives Kruse a reason to declare the captain unfit and take command of the ship. Meanwhile, about to be exposed, Crain organises a mutiny. For it to have any chance of success the American prisoners would need to participate, but when Esther appeals to them for help some only agree on condition that she is sexually compliant with them.

Just before the mutiny occurs, Kruse receives the submarine radio message that Crain's SS identity is false, and arms the loyal part of the crew. The mutiny is then easily defeated and Kruse kills Esther for her part in it, but - though Mueller maintains he is "no traitor" and refuses to aid him - Crain is able to elude his pursuers long enough to detonate the scuttling charges he had not yet disabled. The surviving crew abandon ship, during which the anti-Nazi German sailors make sure the wounded Kruse drowns. Crain and Mueller are then the only persons left on board. Barrels of lard in the ship's hold spill open, expand and act as a stopper, temporarily keeping the ship afloat. Crain asks the captain to radio the Allies for rescue, and is surprised  when he does so.

Cast
 Marlon Brando as Robert Crain
 Yul Brynner as Captain Mueller
 Janet Margolin as Esther Levy
 Trevor Howard as Colonel Statter
 Martin Benrath as Kruse
 Hans Christian Blech as "Donkeyman"
 Wally Cox as Dr. Ambach
 Max Haufler as Branner
 Rainer Penkert as Milkereit
 William Redfield as Baldwin
 Oscar Beregi Jr. as Admiral Wendel (credited as Oscar Beregi)
 Martin Brandt as Nissen
 Charles De Vries as Kurz
 Carl Esmond as Busch
 Martin Kosleck as Wilke
 Norbert Schiller as Steward
 Robert Sorrells as Koeniger, German Crew Member
 Rick Traeger as Crew Member
 Ivan Triesault as Lieutenant Brandt

Reception
The film did not do well on its original release and was a financial disaster. In an attempt to increase its commercial appeal, the film was reissued in 1965 under a new title as Saboteur: Code Name Morituri. Critic Bosley Crowther of the New York Times criticized it for being "turgid." He praised Brando's performance, however, saying:

On review aggregator Rotten Tomatoes, Morituri holds a score of 75% based on 8 reviews, with an average rating of 7.3/10. The title "Morituri", the plural of a Latin word meaning "about to die," is a reference to a phrase used by Suetonius, Ave Imperator, morituri te salutant. (Hail Emperor, they who are about to die salute you.)

Box office
According to Fox records, the film needed to earn $10,500,000 in rentals to break even and made $4,045,000.

Awards
The film was nominated for two Oscars in the 38th Academy Awards (1966) for best black-and-white cinematography (Conrad L. Hall) and best black-and-white costume design (Moss Mabry).

Meet Marlon Brando
After having appeared in a series of box office disappointments, Brando agreed to promote Morituri for the studio by participating in a day-long press junket at the Hampshire House in New York City. This event was the subject of Meet Marlon Brando (1966), a 29-minute black-and-white documentary film directed by Albert and David Maysles and Charlotte Zwerin. Brando was praised for his performance in the documentary by critic Howard Thompson who wrote, "The actor was never more appealing than in this candid-camera cameo, his best performance."

The documentary premiered at the New York Film Festival in 1966. Since then, it has aired on French television but was not shown in its entirety in the United States until specialised streaming service Fandor made it available on November 15, 2013.

References

External links 
 
 
 
 
 

1965 films
1965 drama films
20th Century Fox films
American black-and-white films
Films based on German novels
Films scored by Jerry Goldsmith
Seafaring films
American World War II films
World War II films based on actual events
World War II spy films
American war drama films
1960s English-language films
Films directed by Bernhard Wicki
1960s American films